Aung Myat Thu (born 25 April 1994) is a footballer from Burma, and a striker for Hantharwady United.

References

See also
profile detail

1994 births
Living people
Burmese footballers
Association football forwards
Southern Myanmar F.C. players